Tiziano Bruzzone (born 19 August 1984 in Pisa) is an Italian Association football player who currently plays for Orvietana in Italy's Serie D, having once been on the books at Cagliari in Serie A, though he never made a first team appearance.
Before signing for Cagliari, he was nicknamed "the Luca Toni of Serie D".

References

External links
Gazzetta dello Sport player profile 

1984 births
Living people
Italian footballers
Cagliari Calcio players
Association football forwards